The Upper Truckee River is a stream that flows northward from the western slope of Red Lake Peak in Alpine County, California to Lake Tahoe via the Truckee Marsh in South Lake Tahoe, California. It is Lake Tahoe's largest tributary.

History
At the very top of the Upper Truckee River watershed, Grass Lake and Grass Lake Creek were named by civil engineer and land surveyor, George H. Goddard, who in 1859 crossed Luther Pass from Hope Valley in the West Fork Carson River watershed over the pass and found "a swampy valley...with a pond filled with rank grass that (we) called Grass Lake...".

Watershed
This watershed is the largest in the Lake Tahoe Basin and occupies , which is 18 percent of the total land area tributary to Lake Tahoe. Tributaries include Angora, Echo, Grass Lake, and Big Meadow Creeks, and Upper and Lower Echo, Round, and Dardanelles Lakes. Major lakes include  and smaller lakes include Dardanelles, Round, Showers, Elbert, Tamarack, Ralston, and Angora Lakes.

The stretch between Meyers and South Lake Tahoe is known as Lake Valley.

Historically, Trout Creek was tributary to Upper Truckee River in the Truckee Marsh area near the lake (fig. 2). But with development of the Tahoe Keys, the Upper Truckee River was channeled to the lake and currently the streamflow of the two tributaries combine only during high runoff.

Ecology and restoration
Woody vegetation in the Upper Truckee River watershed is primarily coniferous forest with lodgepole pine, ponderosa pine, Jeffrey pine, white fir, red fir, western white pine, mountain hemlock, and sugar pine. Alders, aspen, and willows are common along the stream zone. Major wetlands include Grass Lake, Osgood Swamp, Truckee Marsh, Benwood Meadow, and Big Meadow. Two large sphagnum bogs, Grass Lake and Osgood Swamp are located in the watershed and both are considered to be Significant Natural Areas by the California Department of Fish and Game (CDFG). Grass Lake has been designated a U.S. Forest Service Research Natural Area. The headwaters are in Desolation Wilderness and in roadless areas managed for quasi-wilderness uses by the U.S. Forest Service. Both areas receive heavy recreational use. The reach of the Upper Truckee above Christmas Valley is under study for inclusion in the federal Wild and Scenic Rivers system. Threatened native Lahontan cutthroat trout (Oncorhynchus clarki henshawi) have been reintroduced into the river in the Meiss Meadows area, and the endangered shorezone plant Lake Tahoe yellowcress (Rorippa subumbellata) is found near the mouth of the river on the shores of Lake Tahoe.

Much of the vast Truckee Marsh was filled to create the Tahoe Keys subdivision. Further hydrologic modification occurred (reaches of the river were channelized) for construction of the South Lake Tahoe airport. Spills of treated wastewater from the South Tahoe Public Utility District's export facilities in this watershed are an ongoing concern.

The straight boulder-lined man-made channel by the airport was converted back to a more natural, meandering course as of November, 2011.

California State Parks acquired two properties to protect wet meadows and floodplain habitat along the Upper Truckee River in the mid 1980s: Washoe Meadows State Park (WMSP) and Lake Valley State Recreation Area (LVSRA).

See also
 Truckee River
 Trout Creek
 Dardanelles and Freel Roadless Areas

References

External links
 Friends of the Upper Truckee River
 Upper Truckee River Restoration and Golf Course Reconfiguration Project, California State Parks (CSP) Reach

Rivers of El Dorado County, California
Rivers of the Sierra Nevada (United States)
Lake Tahoe
Rivers of Northern California
Rivers of the Great Basin
Rivers of the Sierra Nevada in California